Gabriele Grimaldi (13?? – after 1357) was Lord of Monaco from 1352 until 1357. He was the son of Charles I and Lucchina Spinola. He ruled jointly with his father Charles I, his father's paternal uncle Antonio and his brother Rainier II.

Notes 

14th-century births
1358 deaths
14th-century Lords of Monaco
House of Grimaldi
Lords of Monaco